Terrorhawk is the second and final album by the post-hardcore band Bear vs. Shark, released in 2005 by Equal Vision Records. The Clash, Black Sabbath, and Hüsker Dü were all cited by the group as influences on the album. It was written in a cabin in the Upper Peninsula of Michigan.

A video for "Catamaran" was released in February 2006, composed of clips taken from a number of live performances in August and September 2005.

Track listing
All tracks written by Bear vs. Shark.
"Catamaran" – 2:55
"5, 6 Kids" – 3:49
"Six Bar Phrase Hey Hey" – 0:28
"The Great Dinosaurs With Fifties Section" – 3:13
"Baraga Embankment" – 3:07
"Entrance of the Elected" – 3:07
"Seven Stop Hold Restart" – 2:43
"What a Horrible Night for a Cause" – 3:51
"Out Loud Hey Hey" – 1:38
"India Foot" – 0:25
"Antwan" – 2:45
"I Fucked Your Dad" – 3:31
"Heard Iron Bug, "They're Coming to Town"" – 2:39
"Song About Old Roller Coaster" – 6:02
"Rich People Say Fuck Yeah Hey Hey" – 3:45
"Start Small, Great Destroyer" (2016 Remastered vinyl LP bonus track) - 5:07

Personnel
 Dana Collie – saxophone
 John Gaviglio – guitar, bass guitar and vocals
 Ashley Horak – drums
 Derek Kiesgen – guitar and bass guitar
 Mike Muldoon – guitar, bass guitar and keyboards
 Marc Paffi – album artwork, vocals, guitar and keyboards

References

Bear vs. Shark albums
2005 albums
Equal Vision Records albums